Colotis hetaera, the eastern purple tip, is a butterfly in the family Pieridae. It is found in Senegal, Mali, Nigeria, Niger, Sudan, Uganda, Ethiopia, Djibouti, Arabia, Somalia, Kenya, Tanzania and North Africa. The habitat consists of savannah, but penetrating the open parts of evergreen forests.

Adults have a fast flight.

The larvae feed on Capparis, Maerua, Boscia, Cadaba and Ritchiea species.

Subspecies
Colotis hetaera hetaera (coast of Kenya, north-eastern Tanzania)
Colotis hetaera ankolensis Stoneham, 1940 (central Kenya, northern Tanzania, Uganda, Democratic Republic of the Congo)
Colotis hetaera aspasia (Ungemach, 1932) (south-western Ethiopia, southern Sudan, northern Uganda)
Colotis hetaera lorti (Sharpe, 1896) (northern Kenya, south-eastern Ethiopia, Somalia)

References

Seitz, A. Die Gross-Schmetterlinge der Erde 13: Die Afrikanischen Tagfalter. Plate XIII 17

Butterflies described in 1871
hetaera
Butterflies of Africa
Taxa named by Carl Eduard Adolph Gerstaecker